Artyom Geghamyan is an Armenian lawyer. He is a graduate of Yerevan State University, Public Administration Academy, Indiana University, and Harvard University, where he specialized in public administration. On 25 July 2014 he was appointed deputy justice minister of Armenia.

Early years and education 
Artyom Geghamyan was born on January 10, 1980, in Yeghvard, Armenia, where he attended secondary school. As a child, he studied music and played violin. He was so serious about music that was preparing to apply to the conservatory. However, he later changed his mind and entered the law department at the Yerevan State University.

Education  
 1997-2001 Yerevan State University School of Law, Master of Law (LL.M) International Law 
 2001-2003 Yerevan State University School of Law, Bachelor's degree, JurisprudenceUpon graduating from Yerevan State University School of Law in 2001, he started his master's program in the same school in the field of International Trade Law and graduated with honor in 2003. 
 2003-2006 Public Administration Academy of the Republic of Armenia, Doctor of Philosophy (Ph.D.), European Union Law and Integration 
 2006-2007 Indiana University School of Law Indianapolis, LLM, International and Comparative Law  
 2012-2013 Harvard Kennedy School of Government, Master of Public Administration (MPA), Business and Government

Work experience 
 2001–2005 Assistant Chief Justice/Head of Registar in Commercial Court of Appeal
 2005–2006 Senior Legal Counsel in Ameria Legal and Tax Advisors 
 2007–2008 Head of Chair for Criminal Legal Procedure in Prosecutors' Training School
 2008–2009 Head of Department in Ministry of Justice of the Republic of Armenia
 2009–2012 Legal Officer in Council of Europe, Directorate General on Human Rights and Rule of Law 
 2013–2014 Research Fellow/Associate in Transitional Justice in Carr Center for Human Rights Policy, Harvard University Kennedy School of Government 
 2014–2014 Deputy Minister of Justice of the Republic of Armenia
 2014–present Chief Legal Officer in Vallex Group

Awards 
 2009 – Ministry of Justice and JS Memorial Trust John Smith Fellowship,
 2006 – 2007 U.S. Department of State Edmund E. Muskie Fellowship Program,
 2008 – 2010 Open Society Institute Academic Fellowship Program, 
 2008 – 2009 U.S. Department of State Public Service Fellowship,

References

External links
 
 
 
 
 
 

 

1980 births
Harvard Kennedy School alumni
Armenian lawyers
Living people
Indiana University Robert H. McKinney School of Law alumni
Yerevan State University alumni